The Women's foil event took place on October 4, 2009 at Antalya Expo Center.

Draw

Finals

Top half

Section 1

Section 2

Bottom half

Section 3

Section 4

References

External links
 

World Fencing Championships
World